Works in the Palatine Gallery at the Palazzo Pitti in Florence, Italy include:

 Raphael, Madonna of the Grand Duke 
 Raphael, The Madonna of the Chair 
 Raphael, Portrait of Pope Leo X and two Cardinals
 Raphael, companion portraits of Agnolo Doni and his wife, Maddelena Doni, for whom Michelangelo's Doni Tondo was commissioned. 
 Andrea del Sarto, The Young John the Baptist 
 Andrea del Sarto, Disputation on the Holy Trinity 
 Sebastiano del Piombo, Martyrdom of St Agatha
 Titian, Mary Magdalene 
 Titian, Portrait of Pietro Aretino
 Titian, Portrait of an Englishman, perhaps a member of the Howard family, (also known as The Man with Blue Eyes). 
 Murillo, Madonna and Child 
 Rubens, a group portrait known as The four Philosophers 
 Rubens, Allegory of War 
 Caravaggio, The sleeping Cupid 
 Artemisia Gentileschi, Judith 
 Parmigianino, Madonna with the long neck 
 Anthony van Dyck, Portrait of Cardinal Guido Bentivoglio 
 Velázquez, Philip IV of Spain on Horseback

Lists of works of art
Palazzo Pitti